Echidnopsis dammaniana is a succulent species in the genus Echidnopsis. The plants have angled stems and purple flowers. It is found in Ethiopia, Kenya and Somalia and is unusual in collections.

References

Asclepiadoideae